The Olympiapark (English: Olympic Park) in Munich, Germany, is an Olympic Park which was constructed for the 1972 Summer Olympics. Located in the Oberwiesenfeld neighborhood of Munich, the Park continues to serve as a venue for cultural, social, and religious events, such as events of worship. It includes a contemporary carillon. The Park is administered by Olympiapark München GmbH, a holding company fully owned by the state capital of Munich.

Location and structure

The use of the term Olympiapark to designate the overall area has prevailed as a semiofficial practice, but no official name for the entire area exists.

The general area comprises four separate sub-areas:
 Olympic Area: Includes the Olympic sports facilities such as the Olympic Stadium and the Olympic Hall with Olympic Tower. Also in this area are the Aquatic Center and Olympic Event Hall.
 Olympic Village, comprising two villages, one for male and one for female athletes.
 Olympia-Pressestadt, today the home of the Olympia Shopping Center. Strictly speaking, this portion belongs to the area of the Moosach district.
 Olympic Park,  adjoining the Olympic Area to the south, it includes the Olympic Hill and Olympic Lake.

The park is located in the Milbertshofen-Am Hart borough near BMW Group headquarters and the "Uptown" skyscraper of O2. Georg-Bräuchle-Ring divides the area into two halves: Olympic Village and Olympia Pressestadt to the north and Olympic Area and Olympic Park to the south.

History

Third Reich
In the 1930s the Nazi Party planned to develop Munich as the "Capital of the Movement," with this area to serve as the central slaughterhouse and marketplace of the city. The Second World War hindered implementation of this plan.

Up until 1939, Oberwiesenfeld has largely been used as an airfield.

Post-WWII years
After 1945, the Oberwiesenfeld area remained fallow, and was known as a "Trümmerberg," which in German refers to a hill erected from the rubble resulting from the destruction caused by bombings during the war.

Following the war, the US Army occupied this area and had facilities at the Oberwiesefeld. In October 1957, the Army housed most of the refugees from the Hungarian Revolution in a camp at this facility.

Apart from infrastructure projects such as the Oberwiesenfeld Ice Rink, the area remained largely vacant during the post-war decades and presented an ideal site for the construction of the Olympic Stadium and complex.

Preparing for the 1972 Summer Olympics
The International Olympic Committee awarded Munich the 1972 Summer Olympic Games on 26 April 1966.The proposed plans for the urban redevelopment of the Oberwiesenfeld area were solidified.Something that was seen as innovative at the time and that decades later would be commonplace in major sporting events.

The old airfield, intensely used up until 1939,when lost its importance as the Munich-Riem airport was opened that year and was expanded during the next thirty years until it was decommissioned in May 1992. As a result, Oberwiesenfeld airfield area remained largely idle.

When bidding for the 1972 Summer Games,West Germany used the arguments and the concept about an idea of "green and sunny Olympic Games", with an emphasis on democratic and liberty values. Officials sought to integrate optimism toward the future with a positive attitude toward technology and modernist ideals,and in so doing set aside memories of the past, such as the 1936 Summer Olympics in Berlin under Hitler. The architecture firm of Günther Behnisch and its partners developed a comprehensive and avant-garde master plan for the sports and recreation areas, which was under construction from 1968 until 1972. The landscape layout was designed by Günther Grzimek. The eye-catching tensile structure that covers much of the park was designed by German architect and engineer Frei Otto with Behnisch. At the end, the project cost 1.35 billion German marks to complete.

The name "Olympiapark" was related to the city's administrative commission practice for naming metro stations along the city's public transport system.As U and S-system (subway and metropolitan railroad) routes in the city area. On 3 November 1969, they chosen the name "Olympiapark" for the new subway station inside Olympic village, set on the U3 line of the Munich U-Bahn. This naming decision was based on the idea that the name "Olympiapark" was related to the central theme of a "green and sunny Olympic Games". It was also related to the central function of the U-Bahn station, which, together with the bus system,served all the area logistic needs at the area during the games and after their end. The term quickly entered into quasi-official common parlance, and consequently into the international media use. In most situations, the meaning established by the administrative commission is used to describe the entire area, not just the U-Bahn station,unlike was originally intended.

Transportation
Using public transportation, the Munich U-Bahn's U3 line provides a direct route: From Münchner Freiheit (one of Munich Main Plazas,at the district of Schwabing, located on Leopoldstraße), the line connects to Olympiapark via Schwabing and the midtown area. In 2007, the U3 line was extended to continue on to Oberwiesenfeld station near the northern end of the Olympic Village buildings and Olympia-Einkaufszentrum mall for the most far areas of the Park. The continuation to Moosach Station, where the line connects to the S1 S-Bahn line, was finnished during 2010. Olympiazentrum U-Bahn station is a central stop for the MVG bus line. The southern and western portions of the Olympiapark were now also be connected via Munich tram lines 12, 20, 21, and 27. As these areas are remote from the northern part of Olympiapark, they are primarily of interest for the annual Tollwood music festival held there each summer.

After the 1972 Summer Olympic Games, the Olympic Stadium Station was disconnected from regular lines. It was used for some events, but the station was closed in 1988 and the tracks taken up in 2003.Since this,the station is it is completely deactivated and has since been abandoned and unused.

The Olympiapark is accessible by car via Mittlerer Ring motorway. The Olympic Village area is actually closed off from car traffic.

Olympic Area in detail

The Olympic Area lies south of Georg-Brauchle-Ring and north of the Olympiasee lake; it is the smallest portion of the entire Olympiapark area. It comprises the following competition sites:

Olympic Stadium

The central stadium, constructed from 1968 to 1972, was designed by the architecture firm of Behnisch and Partners. It is currently home to the highest number of staged national and international competitions in Germany. Originally constructed to hold 75,000 visitors, this number was reduced at the end of the 1990s to 69,000 due to security concerns. After the Olympic Games, the Stadium was used primarily for football matches and served as the home stadium for the football teams FC Bayern München and TSV 1860 München. Since the opening of the Allianz Arena in 2005, the site is used almost exclusively for cultural events.

Olympic Hall 

Also designed by the architecture firm of Behnisch and Partners, Olympic Hall is a sport and recreational facility located northeast of the Olympic Stadium. Its capacity is 12,500 with seats, or 15,700 without seats.

Small Olympic Hall 

Smaller event facility at the Olympic Hall for up to 1,000 seated individuals, according to stage size.

Aquatic Center 

This venue became an integral part of Olympic history when the US swimmer Mark Spitz won 7 gold medals there during the 1972 Munich Games. This amounted to a remarkable comeback for Mark Spitz, who had fallen short of the 5 gold medals expected of him at the 1968 Mexico Olympics. The venue also saw significant success by the young women's team of the GDR, which was later found - albeit, the matter was essentially an open secret - to be the result of an extensive doping programme.

One notable feature of the Munich Schwimmhalle is the way in which the cobbled paths leading to the venue continue under the canopy as far as the top of the seating area, thus creating the genuine impression of walking in off the street to one's seat.  The venue is available both to swimming teams and also to the public.

Olympic Ice Sports Center
The Olympic Icestadion was built from April 1965 by the plans of Rolf Schütze and opened on 12 February 1967 with the ice hockey game between FC Bayern Munich and SC Riessersee. After using it for the 1969 World Table Tennis Championships, the Icestadion was used for the Olympic Summer games 1972 for the Boxsports. The stadium has a capacity for 6,142 visitors and is used for the games of the team of EHC Red Bull München at the Deutsche Eishockey Liga.

On the left site of the Icestadion stands an open air ice skating rink. In 1980 it was decided to build a roof over the open air rink in order to have it operational during the whole year independent of the weather conditions. The German architectural firm Ackermann und Partner designed an elegant light-weight tensile structure spanning 100 meters length-wise. The building was completed in 1983. In 2004 the ice skating rink was closed and is now used to play Indoorsoccer.

On the right side of the Icestadion 1991 the new training hall for the Icesport world championship was built over the parking area after the plans of Kurt Ackermann

Velodrome

Olympic Tower

The Olympiaturm has an overall height of 291 m and a weight of 52,500 tonnes. At a height of 190 m there is an observation platform as well as a small rock and roll museum housing various memorabilia. Since its opening in 1968 the tower has registered over 35 million visitors (as of 2004). At a height of 182 m there is a revolving restaurant that seats 230 people. A full revolution takes 53 minutes. The tower has one Deutsche Telekom maintenance elevator with a speed of 4 m/s, as well as two visitor lifts with a speed of 7 m/s which have a capacity of about 30 people per cabin. The travel time from the ground to the viewing platform is about 30 seconds.

Olympic Village 

This was the site of the Munich massacre in the second week of the Games, when eleven of the Israeli team and a West German policeman were murdered by Black September Palestinian terrorists.
 Olympic Village
 Student District

Olympia Pressestadt 

The Olympia Pressestadt lies west of the Olympiapark between Landshuter Allee in the east and Riesstraße in the west. It is the site of the former media center and today provides regular housing.

Carillon 
The carillon, built in 1972, was one of five carillons in Bavaria. Rather than occupying a traditional bell tower, it was set on an open framework with the bells exposed to view. It was built for the 1972 Summer Olympics on Coubertinplatz, the central square in the Olympic Park. It was made by the Dutch bell foundry Royal Eijsbouts and has a range of 50 bells (originally 49 bells, 1991 retrofit a Cis bell).

In 2007, the Olympic Carillon was dismantled due to restructuring measures in the Olympic Park. It was reinstalled in 2012, with American carillonneur Jim Saenger "ringing in" the rebuilt carillon with a concert on April 16, 2012.

Munich Olympic Walk Of Stars 
In 2003 the Munich Olympic Walk of Stars was constructed as a path from the Olympic Sea, als Weg am Olympiasee, in the style of the Hollywood Walk of Fame. Celebrities leave their hand- and footprints behind in the concrete. Singer Howard Carpendale was the first to do so, and since then roughly 30 personalities from culture and sport have left impressions of themselves behind.

Regular events (apart from concerts) 

The Olympiapark host a number of regular events on a yearly basisː

Olympic Hall 
 Six-Day-Run (since 1972)
 Munich Indoors (since 1998)
 Supercross-Cup (since 1999)
 Holiday on Ice (since 1975)
 Night of the Proms (since 1995)
 International Exhibition (since 1972)
 Watchtower-Congress of the Jehovah's Witnesses (since 1973)

Olympic Swim Hall 
 24-Hour-Swim (since 2000)
 Munich Triathlon (since 2003, always at the end of May)
They opened at 17 January 1970

Open-Air Theatron 
 Summer Music Theatron (since 1972)
 Open-Air Pentecost Theatron (since 2001)

Others 
 Spartan Race Sprint
 Tollwood Festival (summer music festival)
 Summerfest in Olympiapark
 Münchner Sommernachtstraum

Public establishments

Education and learning 
 Elementary school on Nadistrasse (known as "Nadischule")
 Zentrale Hochschulsportanlage, joint central sports facility of Munich's universities and colleges.
 Department of Sport and Health Sciences at Technical University of Munich.
 Olympiastützpunkt Bayern

Health 
 Outpatient department for sport orthopedics at TU Munich's Rechts der Isar teaching hospital.

Sport 
 Olympic staging post of Bavaria

Memorials 

 Memorial for the civilian victims of the Second World War (Olympiaberg)
 Memorial plaque for the victims of the attack on the Israeli Olympic team of 1972
 Erinnerungsort Olympia-Attentat

See also
 Tensile and membrane structures
 Zentrale Hochschulsportanlage

References

External links

 Olympiapark München GmbH
 www.olypark.de (a student project of the tum/dept Architecture)
 Olympiapark München - Interactive Panorama
 ganz-muenchen.de: Veranstaltungskalender für das Olympiagelände
 Internetauftritt des Theatron
 muenchen.de: Olympiapark
 Webcam Olympiastadion
 Olympiapark and Stadion, Photos
 GigaPan ultra-high-resolution interactive panorama

Carillons
Olympic Parks
Venues of the 1972 Summer Olympics
Sports venues in Munich
Tensile membrane structures
Olympic International Broadcast Centres
Parks and open spaces in Munich
Milbertshofen-Am Hart